Frengky Deaner Missa (born 20 February 2004) is an Indonesian professional footballer who plays as a full-back or winger for Liga 1 club Persija Jakarta and the Indonesia national under-20 team.

Club career

Persija Jakarta
On 23 July 2022, Missa made his first-team debut by being starting player in a 1–0 loss match against Bali United at Kapten I Wayan Dipta Stadium. He scored his first goal for the club on 31 July 2022 in a 2–1 winning match against Persis at Patriot Candrabhaga Stadium when he was 18 years old.

International career
On 14 September 2022, Missa made his debut for Indonesia U-20 national team against Timor-Leste U-20, in a 4–0 win in the 2023 AFC U-20 Asian Cup qualification. In October 2022, it was reported that Frengky received a call-up from the Indonesia U-20 for a training camp, in Turkey and Spain.

Career statistics

Club

Notes

References

External links
 

2004 births
Living people
Indonesian footballers
Persija Jakarta players
Association football fullbacks
Association football wingers
Sportspeople from East Nusa Tenggara
Liga 1 (Indonesia) players
Indonesia youth international footballers